Lapan is a commune in the Cher department in the Centre-Val de Loire region of France.

Geography

Population

Sights
 The eighteenth-century chateau of Houet.
 The watermill.
 The church of St. Caprais, dating from the twelfth century.

See also
Communes of the Cher department

References

External links

Lapan on the Quid website 

Communes of Cher (department)